Arcturian may refer to:
 Arcturian (album), 2015 album by the Norwegian avant-garde metal band Arcturus
 Arcturian (Star Trek), a race in the Star Trek canon
 Arcturians (New Age), according to certain new age movements a very advanced alien civilization of Arcturus
 Arcturus (disambiguation)